For the New York politician, see William North.

William Campbell North (June 21, 1859 – November 2, 1924) was a member of the Wisconsin Legislature.

Biography
He was born in Dodge County, Wisconsin on June 21, 1859. He studied law in the office of Hon. Charles Allen of Horicon. He was admitted to the bar in 1880 and opened a law firm in Chillicothe, Missouri. After three years, he returned to Dodge County and opened an office in Fox Lake.

He was first elected to the Wisconsin Senate in 1902, beating M.P. Elkinton (Rep) and B.F. Sawyer (Pro).

He died on November 2, 1924, and is buried in Riverside Memorial Park, in Fox Lake.

References

People from Dodge County, Wisconsin
Democratic Party Wisconsin state senators
Democratic Party members of the Wisconsin State Assembly
Missouri lawyers
Wisconsin lawyers
1859 births
1924 deaths
People from Chillicothe, Missouri
People from Fox Lake, Wisconsin
19th-century American lawyers